McKellar (Manitouwabing) Water Aerodrome  is located on Lake Manitouwabing, adjacent to McKellar, Ontario, Canada. Skiplanes operate from the aerodrome in winter.

See also
 Mattawa Airport

References

Registered aerodromes in Parry Sound District
Seaplane bases in Ontario